This is a discography for the British musician Howard Jones.

Albums

Studio albums

Compilation albums

Live albums

Extended plays

Singles

As main artist

As featured artist

Videography

References

Discographies of British artists
Rock music discographies
Pop music discographies
New wave discographies